The Baños del Cenizal are an Islamic baths located in the city of Toledo, in Castile-La Mancha, Spain. These Islamic baths, preserved in the cellars under the building of the calle Bajada del Colegio de Infantes nº 14 street, have had as purpose its conversion into a visitable space, by means of its putting in value with an appropriate approach of recovery of its most remarkable elements. It has focused on two rooms that make up the bath or hammam: the main hall and cold room, since all other rooms (hot and warm rooms) are conserved under the adjacent buildings. They are declared of Bien de Interés Cultural.

References

External links
Baños del Cenizal in turismocastillalamancha.es (in Spanish)
Baños del Cenizal in toledo-virtual.com

Buildings and structures in Toledo, Spain
Moorish architecture in Spain
Public baths in Spain